Opp is a city in Covington County, Alabama, United States. At the 2020 census, the population was 6,771.
Opp is named after Henry Opp, a lawyer for the Louisville and Nashville Railroad.

Geography
Opp is located in eastern Covington County at  (31.283083, -86.254661). It is bordered by the town of Babbie to the west and the town of Horn Hill to the southwest.

U.S. Routes 84 and 331 are the main roads that pass near the city. US 84 bypasses the city to the south and east, leading northeast  to Elba and west  to Andalusia, the county seat of Covington County. US 331 bypasses the city to the east (with US 84), and leads north  to Brantley and south  to Florala, on the Florida state line. Alabama State Route 52 runs southeast  to the town of Kinston from US 84/331.

Demographics

2020 census

As of the 2020 United States census, there were 6,771 people, 2,701 households, and 1,768 families residing in the city.

2010 census
As of the census of 2010, there were 6,659 people and 2,655 households, and 1,823 families residing in the city. The population density was 388 people per square mile. The racial makeup of the city was 80.9% White, 16.7% Black or African American, 0.6% Native American, 0.3% Asian, and 1.2% from two or more races. 0.9% of the population were Hispanic or Latino of any race.

In 2000, there were 2,753 households, out of which 28.4% had children under the age of 18 living with them, 50.5% were married couples living together, 14.8% had a female householder with no husband present, and 30.8% were non-families. 28.8% of all households were made up of individuals, and 15.0% had someone living alone who was 65 years of age or older. The average household size was 2.33 and the average family size was 2.85.

In the city, the population was 23.3% under the age of 18, 7.9% from 18 to 24, 24.6% from 25 to 44, 23.6% from 45 to 64, and 20.6% who were 65 years of age or older. The median age was 41 years. For every 100 females, there were 79.8 males. For every 100 females age 18 and over, there were 76.9 males. The median income for a household in the city was $26,702, and the median income for a family was $32,436. Males had a median income of $27,821 versus $21,280 for females. The per capita income for the city was $15,281. About 14.2% of families and 18.2% of the population were below the poverty line, including 28.8% of those under age 18 and 15.8% of those age 65 or over.

Notable people
Mooski, entertainer, rapper, song artist
Lew Childre, entertainer, inventor, musician and member Of The Grand Ole Opry'''
Mike DuBose, former Alabama Crimson Tide head football coach
David F. Gantt, New York state legislator
Tim Jessie, NFL player
James Logan, NFL player
Alberta Martin- penultimate Confederate Widow 
Lamar Rogers, NFL player
Peggy Scott-Adams, blues and R&B singer
Thomas K. Hearn, 12th president, Wake Forest University

Slogan 
Opp's city slogan is "The City of OPPortunity".

References

External links

Cities in Alabama
Cities in Covington County, Alabama